Time Is Not Our Fried is a compilation album by Bugskull, released on November 17, 2009 by Digitalis Recordings. It is a two CD set collecting remixed and remastered material from early bugskull cassettes, vinyl and compilation releases.

Track listing

Release history

References 

2009 compilation albums
Bugskull albums